Goniograptus is an extinct genus of graptolites.

References

 Dinosaurs to Dodos: An Encyclopedia of Extinct Animals by Don Lessem and Jan Sovak

Graptolite genera
Paleozoic life of Newfoundland and Labrador